The Three Sisters are a mountain range in Siskiyou County, California. The Karuk name for the Three Sisters is asavêehkak.

References 

Mountain ranges of Northern California
Landforms of Siskiyou County, California